Dirtwire is an American band consisting of David Satori, and Evan Fraser, who both play a variety of uncommon musical instruments.  They perform a form of swamptronic experimental music that incorporates electronic music and instruments from around the world.

The group, which is based in the San Francisco Bay Area of California, United States, began as a duo.  They met at the California Institute of the Arts.

Dirtwire has released nine albums.

Instruments
Dirtwire is known for incorporating a wide range of musical instruments from around the world.  Their website says, "At a Dirtwire show you can be guaranteed to hear and see a wide range of instruments being played and woven into an electronic music context, including melodicas, guitarjo, electric space fiddle, drums, jaw harps, vocals, harmonica, ... overtone flutes, kamale ngoni, kalimba, toy megaphone, percussion, whamola, resonator guitar, fujara, ukulele, and Siberian ghost catcher mouthbow."  They also play the Bolo, Dobro-style guitar, and the mbira, a Zimbabwean thumb piano.  Their website previously listed the ilimba, slide guitar, slide banjo, jimbush, kone, guimbri, kaen, berimbau, pandeiro, zabumba, and calabash.

Genre
Dirtwire lists possible genres for their music as "future revival, swamptronica, spaghetti-step, [and] electro-twang".  In an interview, member Evan Fraser additionally offered, "blues n’ bass, electro acoustic fusion, [and] globo electro."

See also
Avant-garde music
Experimental music
Ngoni (instrument)
Beats Antique

References

External links
Official site
A dozen questions with Evan Fraser of Dirtwire, bozemandailychronicle.com, 2018
Dirtwire mixes electronica, world in Bend – Supergroup to perform at Volcanic Theatre Pub, bendbulletin.com, 2017
Artist Interview: Dirtwire Talk Latest Release, 'The Carrier', Environmental Issues, and What Makes Colorado Special – Compose Yourself Magazine, 2014
Evan Fraser of Dirtwire on developing compassion and authenticity through music, trialanderrorcollective.com, 2016

2012 establishments in the United States
American surrealist artists
Surrealist groups
American musical duos
American musical trios
Musical groups established in 2012
Musical groups from the San Francisco Bay Area